Central Street may refer to:

United States
 Central Street (Evanston, Illinois)
 Central station (CTA Purple Line)
 Evanston Central Street (Metra)
 Central Street District, Andover, Massachusetts
 Central Street Historic District (Millville, Massachusetts)
 Central Street Historic District (Narragansett, Rhode Island)

Other countries
 Central Street (Harbin, China)
 Central Street (Helsinki, Finland)
 Central Street (Taiwan)